Beslan is a town in the Republic of North Ossetia–Alania, Russia.

Beslan may also refer to:

2004 school attack
Beslan: The Tragedy of School No. 1, a book
Beslan school siege, 2004 hostage crisis
Timeline of the Beslan school siege
Mothers of Beslan
Voice of Beslan
Beslan charity efforts
International response to the Beslan school siege

People
Beslan Adzhindzhal (b. 1974), Russian football player
Beslan Ardzinba, mayor of Pitsunda, Abkhazia
Beslan Arshba, governor of Gali District, Abkhazia
Beslan Butba, a businessman and politician from Abkhazia
Beslan Dbar, candidate in the 2007 Abkhazian parliamentary election
Beslan Eshba, deputy of the 5th convocation of the People's Assembly of Abkhazia
Beslan Gantamirov, Chechen politician, one of the leaders on the Russian side of the Battle of Grozny (1999–2000)
Beslan Gubliya (b. 1976), Russian football player
Beslan Karchava, participant in the 2011 Abkhazian local elections
Beslan Kubrava, Head of the Presidential Administration in the Government of President Ankvab, Abkhazia
Beslan Kvitsinia, member of the 5th convocation of the Sukhumi City Council, Abkhazia
Beslan Mudranov, competitor in the 2010 World Judo Championships – Men's 60 kg
Beslan Sergei-ipa Kubrava, Vice Premier in the Government of President Bagapsh, Abkhazia
Beslan Shinkuba, member of the 5th convocation of the Sukhumi City Council, Abkhazia
Beslan Tsvinaria, member of the People's Assembly of Abkhazia

Other
FC FAYUR Beslan, soccer team from the Republic of North Ossetia–Alania, Russia
Beslan Airport, an airport in the Republic of North Ossetia–Alania, Russia
6374 Beslan, a main-belt asteroid